Y Drosgl is a summit of the Carneddau range in Snowdonia, Wales, and forms a part of the western Carneddau, also known as the Berau, meaning 'stacks' or 'ricks'.
It lies on a ridge heading west from Carnedd Gwenllian and Bera Mawr towards Bethesda. A large ancient burial cairn, dating from the Bronze Age, adorns the summit, from where good views of Cwm Caseg and the Menai can be seen.

References

External links
www.geograph.co.uk : photos of and from Garnedd Uchaf

Hewitts of Wales
Mountains and hills of Snowdonia
Nuttalls
Abergwyngregyn
Llanllechid
Mountains and hills of Gwynedd